Bauhs Nunatak is a prominent nunatak,  high, at the north side of Walcott Neve, about  south-southeast of Mount Sirius. It was named by the Advisory Committee on Antarctic Names for Luvern R. Bauhs, a United States Antarctic Research Program ionospheric scientist at South Pole Station, 1959.

References 

Nunataks of the Ross Dependency
Dufek Coast